Calm Down Gurrl is the sixth album and seventeenth Bravo stand-up comedy special by stand-up comedian Kathy Griffin and nineteenth overall.

Track listing

Personnel

Technical and production
Kathy Griffin – executive producer
Jenn Levy – executive producer
Paul Miller – executive producer
Kimber Rickabaugh – executive producer
Jeff U'ren – film editor
Bruce Ryan – production design
Cisco Henson – executive in charge of production
Lesley Maynard – associate director / stage manager
Davi Crivelli – technical supervisor

Visuals and imagery
Ashlee Mullen – hair stylist / make-up artist
Simon Miles – lighting designer

Award and nominations
The live Bravo performance special won the Grammy for Best Comedy Album in the 56th Grammy Awards.

References

External links
Kathy Griffin's Official Website

Kathy Griffin albums
Stand-up comedy albums
2013 live albums
Grammy Award for Best Comedy Album
2010s comedy albums
2010s spoken word albums
Spoken word albums by American artists
Live spoken word albums
Back Lot Music live albums
Live comedy albums